Roberto Clemente State Park is a  state park in Morris Heights, Bronx, New York City. The park is adjacent to the Harlem River, the Major Deegan Expressway (Interstate 87), and the Morris Heights station on Metro-North's Hudson Line.

History
Roberto Clemente State Park, originally named Harlem River State Park, opened in 1973 and was the first New York state park established in an urban setting. The park was renamed in 1974 for Roberto Clemente, the first Latino-American to be inducted into the Baseball Hall of Fame. Clemente was killed in an air crash while trying to assist relief efforts after the 1972 Nicaragua earthquake.

The park is managed by a partnership of nonprofit New York Restoration Project and New York City Department of Parks and Recreation.

Park description

Roberto Clemente State Park offers a recreation building, a swimming pool, picnic tables, a playground, recreation programs, ball fields and basketball courts, biking, and a waterfront esplanade. This park connects to Bridge Park to its south.

See also
 List of New York state parks

References

External links

 New York State Parks: Roberto Clemente State Park

State parks of New York (state)
Parks in the Bronx
Protected areas established in 1973
1973 establishments in New York City
Morris Heights, Bronx